NA-50 Attock-II is a constituency for the National Assembly of Pakistan.

Members of Parliament

1970–1977: NW-31 Campbellpur-II

1977: NA-42 Campbellpur-II

1985–2002: NA-42 Attock-II

2002–2018: NA-58 Attock-II

2018-2022: NA-56 Attock-II

Detailed Results

Election 2002 

General elections were held on 10 Oct 2002. Malik Allah Yar Khan of PML-Q won by 88,784 votes.

Election 2008 

Chaudhry Pervaiz Elahi succeeded in the election 2008 and became the member of National Assembly.

Election 2013  

General elections were held on 11 May 2013. Malik Atibar Khan of PML-N won by 85,244 votes and became the  member of National Assembly.

Election 2018

General elections were held on 25 July 2018. The constituency got second highest number of total votes polled in all of Pakistan.

By-election 2018

By-elections were held in this constituency on 14 October 2018.

See also
NA-49 Attock-I
NA-51 Murree-cum-Rawalpindi

References

External links 
Election result's official website

56
A-56